Jason Yuen Chun Sing (born 16 February 1993) is a former Hong Kong professional footballer who played as a striker.

Early life
Born in Hong Kong, Yuen was discovered by then Tai Po youth coach Lee Chi Kin. Along with Leung Kwun Chung, Lam Hok Hei and Fong Pak Lun, the four were stand out players on the North District club's youth teams. At 11 years old, Yuen was selected to the Hong Kong Schools Sports Federation football team and led the team to the tournament championship. His performances led to an invitation to train at Sun Hei's youth academy. He accepted the invitation and trained there until he left while attending Diocesan Boys' School. After Form 2, he left Hong Kong to attend boarding school in the United Kingdom. Jason grew up in Rainham, Kent and went to the Howard School in Rainham.

Club career

Sun Hei
Upon graduating from Kingston University in 2015, Yuen returned to Hong Kong with plans to be a banker full-time and a footballer in his spare time.

On 23 January 2016, Yuen scored the winner in the 2-1 victory over Tai Po and helped his team to capture the HKFA Cup Junior Division. On 17 April 2016, he scored the lone goal as part of the Hong Kong Select XI squad which lost 7-1 in the final of an exhibition showcase to a Central European XI managed by Andriy Shevchenko.

In December 2016, Yuen went on trial with Pegasus who were in need of attacking reinforcements. In the end, the two sides did not reach an agreement on a contract.

Yuen finished the 2016-17 season as the First Division's top scorer with 40 goals in 24 appearances.

Tai Po
On 3 May 2017, Yuen reached an agreement with Hong Kong Premier League club Tai Po. During an interview with Oriental Daily, Yuen's former youth coach Lee Chi Kin revealed that Yuen had been training with Tai Po since he had returned from the UK.

On 9 September 2017, Yuen scored his first goal for Tai Po in a 3–1 victory over Eastern.

R&F
After one season with Tai Po, Yuen moved to fellow HKPL side R&F. On 14 October 2020, Yuen left the club after his club's withdrawal from the HKPL in the new season.

Pegasus
After spending half season in R&F, he was loaned to Pegasus on 21 January 2019.

Honours

Club
Sun Hei
 HKFA Cup Junior Division: 2016–17

Individual
 Hong Kong First Division Top Scorer: 2016–17

References

External links
 Yuen Chun Sing at HKFA
 
 

Hong Kong footballers
Hong Kong First Division League players
Hong Kong Premier League players
1993 births
Sun Hei SC players
Tai Po FC players
R&F (Hong Kong) players
TSW Pegasus FC players
Living people
Association football forwards
Hong Kong League XI representative players